James McGhee (1862–1941) was a Scottish international footballer and football manager.

James McGhee may also refer to:
 James William McGhee (1882–1968), American inventor
 Jimmy McGhee (active 1920s), United States-based soccer player, son of James McGhee
 Jim McGhee (born 1930), Scottish footballer with clubs including Kilmarnock, Newport County and Ballymena United

See also
 James Magee (disambiguation)
 James McGee (disambiguation)
 James McGhie, Lord McGhie, Scottish lawyer
McGhee, a surname